Chungnam Provincial College is the only institution of higher education located in rural Cheongyang County, in South Chungcheong province, South Korea.  It is a public technical college, offering instruction in a range of vocational fields.  It employs around 23 full-time instructors.

Academics

Academic offerings are divided among departments of Civil Engineering, Visual Information Design, Fire Safety Engineering, Display Electronic Engineering, Computer Information, Environmental Health Science, Beauty Coordination, Local Autonomy Administration, Land Administration, and Tourism.

History

The school opened its doors in 1998, planning for such an institution having begun in 1994.

See also
List of national universities in South Korea
List of universities and colleges in South Korea
Education in Korea

External links
Official website, in Korean

Universities and colleges in South Chungcheong Province
1998 establishments in South Korea
Educational institutions established in 1998
Public universities and colleges in South Korea